Aleksanyan, also transliterated as Aleksanian, Alexanyan, Alexanian, Aleqsanyan and Aleqsanian, is an Armenian surname. Notable people with the surname include:

Alexis Alexanian, American film producer
Aris Alexanian (1901–1961), Armenian businessman
Artak Aleksanyan (born 1991), Armenian footballer
Artur Aleksanyan (born 1991), Armenian sport wrestler
David Alexanian (born 1967), American film director and producer
Diran Alexanian (1881–1954), Armenian cello teacher
Gegham Aleksanyan (born 1962), Armenian artist
Gevorg Aleksanyan (born 1981), Armenian weightlifter
Karen Aleksanyan (born 1980), Armenian footballer
Kristine Aleksanyan (born 1989), Armenian footballer
Marat Aleksanian (born 1949), Armenian politician
Narine Aleqsanyan (born 1967), Armenian actress and television presenter
Nubar Alexanian (born 1950), American photographer
Ruben Aleksanyan (born 1990), Armenian weightlifter
Valeri Aleksanyan (born 1984), Armenian footballer
Vasily Aleksanyan (1971–2011), Russian lawyer and businessman
Victoria Aleksanyan (born 1987), Armenian film director

Armenian-language surnames